Hezhou (贺州) is a prefecture-level city and former prefecture in Guangxi, China.

Hezhou may also refer to the followings:

Places
Hezhou (Anhui) (和州), a prefecture between the 6th and 20th centuries in modern Anhui 
Hezhou (Chongqing) (合州), a prefecture between the 6th and 20th centuries in modern Chongqing and Sichuan
Hezhou (Gansu) (河州), modern Linxia City
Hezhou, Hunan (河洲), a town in Qidong County, Hunan

Others
Hezhou language

See also
He (disambiguation)